Újpesti Torna Egylet vízilabda szakosztály is a Hungarian water polo club from Újpest, Budapest, that is part of Újpesti TE sport society. The club was founded in 1885, while the waterpolo department (together with the swimming department) was created in 1911. During its history, the club have won 26 national championship titles, more than any other teams.

Naming history
 Újpesti Torna Egylet (UTE): ( ... –1949)
 Budapesti Dózsa (Bp. Dózsa): (1950 – 1956)
 Újpesti Dózsa: (1957 – 1989/90)
 Újpesti TE: (1990/91 – 1992/93)
 UTE-Primavera: (1993/94) - the first naming sponsor
 UTE-Office & Home: (1994/95 – 1997/98)
 UTE-Taxi2000: (1998/99)
 UTE-Santal-Taxi2000: (1999/00)
 UTE-Humet: (2000/01 – 2001/02)
 UTE-Taxi2000: (2002/03 – 2003/04)
 UTE-VB Leasing: (2004/05 – 2005/06)
 UTE-Óbuda-Újlak: (2006/07)
 Uniqa-UTE: (2007/08 – 2009/10)
 Újpesti TE: (2010/11)

Honours

Domestic competitions 
Országos Bajnokság I (National Championship of Hungary)
 Champions (26) – record: 1930, 1931, 1932, 1933, 1934, 1935, 1936, 1937, 1938, 1939, 1941, 1942, 1945, 1946, 1948, 1950, 1951, 1952, 1955, 1960, 1967, 1985–86, 1990–91, 1992–93, 1993–94, 1994–95

Magyar Kupa (National Cup of Hungary)
 Winners (17) – record: 1929, 1931, 1932, 1933, 1934, 1935, 1936, 1938, 1939, 1944, 1948, 1951, 1952, 1955, 1960, 1963, 1975, 1990–91, 1992–93

European competitions 
LEN Champions League (Champions Cup)
Winners (1): 1993–94

LEN Euro Cup
Winners (3): 1992–93, 1996–97, 1998–99

LEN Super Cup
Winners (1): 1994

Recent seasons

In European competition
Participations in Champions League (European Cup, Euroleague): x
Participations in Euro Cup: x
Participations in Cup Winners' Cup: x

Notable former players

Olivér Halassy  ( 1932 Los Angeles, 1936 Berlin )
János Németh  ( 1932 Los Angeles, 1936 Berlin )
Mihály Bozsi  ( 1936 Berlin )
István Barta  ( 1932 Los Angeles )
Károly Szittya  ( 1952 Helsinki )
György Kutasi  ( 1936 Berlin )
Alajos Keserű  ( 1932 Los Angeles )
Miklós Sárkány  ( 1932 Los Angeles, 1936 Berlin )
Dezső Lemhényi  ( 1952 Helsinki )
Dezső Fábián  ( 1952 Helsinki )
Mihály Mayer  ( 1956 Melbourne, 1964 Tokyo )
Dezső Gyarmati  ( 1952 Helsinki, 1956 Melbourne, 1964 Tokyo )
György Vízvári  ( 1952 Helsinki )
Miklós Martin  ( 1952 Helsinki )

Zoltán Dömötör  ( 1964 Tokyo )
Ottó Boros  ( 1956 Melbourne, 1964 Tokyo )
László Sárosi  ( 1976 Montreal )
Gábor Csapó  ( 1976 Montreal )
Tibor Cservenyák  ( 1976 Montreal )
Tibor Benedek  ( 2000 Sydney, 2004 Athens, 2008 Beijing )
Tamás Kásás  ( 2000 Sydney, 2004 Athens, 2008 Beijing )
Péter Biros  ( 2000 Sydney, 2004 Athens, 2008 Beijing )
Gergely Kiss  ( 2000 Sydney, 2004 Athens, 2008 Beijing )
Tamás Molnár  ( 2000 Sydney, 2004 Athens, 2008 Beijing )
Dániel Varga  ( 2008 Beijing )
Dénes Varga  ( 2008 Beijing ) 
Bulcsú Székely  ( 2000 Sydney ) 
Tamás Varga  ( 2004 Athens, 2008 Beijing )

Tamás Dala
Kálmán Kislégi
Balázs Vincze

External links
  Official website

Water polo clubs in Hungary
Sports clubs established in 1911
Sport in Budapest
Újpest FC
1911 establishments in Hungary
Defunct water polo clubs